Hanwha Group  is a large business conglomerate (chaebol) in South Korea. Founded in 1952 as Korea Explosives Co., the group has grown into a large multi-profile business conglomerate, with diversified holdings stretching from explosives, their original business, to energy, materials, aerospace, mechatronics, finance, retail and lifestyle services. In 1992 the company adopted its abbreviation as its new name: "Hanwha".

History

1952–1999 
Kim Chong-hee founded Korea Explosives Co. in October 1952. Prior to founding the company, Kim worked as a gunpowder engineer for the 'Chosun Explosives Factory', a Japanese company. Later, he won the bid for the company and its Incheon factory and started the company there. 

From 1952–1963, the Korea Explosives Co. produced industrial explosives domestically, which was needed for construction and engineering of infrastructure. In the same time period, the Korea Explosives Co. started producing nitroglycerin, which gave it a monopoly in the field of explosives and gunpowder. In 1959, the Hanwha group started producing domestic dynamite. 

From 1964–1980 the Hanwha group started to make investments in various fields, starting the foundation of it becoming a chaebol. Later in the mid 1960s, Korea Hwasung industrial Co. was founded (now Hanwha Solutions), and entered the petrochemical market. Hanwha increased its competitiveness in the machinery market by acquiring Shinhan Bearing Industrial. Hanwha founded Kyung-in Energy in 1969, and the Hankook Precision Tools (now Hanwha Corporation/Momentum) followed suit, being founded in 1971. 

From 1981 to 1995, Kim Seung-youn became the second chairman of the company, and more investments in diverse markets were initiated. It expanded further into the chemical industry by acquiring both Hanyang Chemicals (now also Hanwha Solutions) and Dow Chemicals Korea in 1982, expanded into the resorts industry by acquiring the Junga group (now Hanwha Hotels & Resorts) in 1985, and expanded into the leisure and distribution industry by acquiring Hanyang Stores (now Hanwha Galleria) in 1986. In the 1990s, the Hanwha Group founded Hanwha BASF Urethane, Hanwha NSK Precision, Hanwha GKN, Hanwha Machinery Hub Eye Bearings, SKF Hanwha Auto Parts, and Hanwha Motors. In 1992, the Korea Explosives Co. changed its name to Hanwha, and Binggrae was separated and made independent from the company.

2000–Present 
In 2002, Hanwha expanded into the life insurance industry by acquiring Korea Life Insurance. From 2007-present, Hanwha is undergoing global expansion. Hanwha acquired Azdel, an American company in 2007 and created a PVC plant in Ningbo, Zhejiang, China in 2011. Hanwha Q CELLS was launched in 2012. In 2014, Hanwha acquired Samsung Techwin, Samsung Thales, and Samsung Total. Since 2019, Hanwha is operating the largest solar module plant (1.7 GW) in the United States; It is located in Dalton, Georgia.  As of 2019, Hanwha has a total of 466 affiliates, 84 being domestic and 382 overseas.

Controversy 
In 2011, Kim Seung-yeon, the current chairman of the Hanwha Group, was fined 5.1 billion KRW and was jailed for 4 years on charges of embezzlement and breach of trust.

Key networks 
 R&D: Germany, Malaysia, USA, China, and South Korea
 Manufacturing: Germany, Czech Republic, Malaysia, China, South Korea and USA
 Marketing & Sales: Australia, Canada, Japan, USA, China, and South Korea

Business areas

Solar & Energy 
Hanwha QCELLS is the 5th largest producer of solar cells in the world. In a meeting held on May 21st, 2022, Kim Dong-kwan, the president of Hanwha Solutions, laid down a plan to spend 36.7 trillion KRW on its energy and aerospace sectors, and said he wanted to commit the company to solar energy to reduce its carbon footprint and supply high quality energy. Additionally, he announced plans to build another modular factory in the United States. In order to tackle the problem of stagnating bee populations, Hanwha has created a solar beehive, that helps to protect and maintain a stable bee population. Hanwha QCELLS has launched a new brand that ventures into the electric vehicle charging market called Hanwha Motiev in 2022.

Aerospace & Mechatronics 
Hanwha is also extensively investing in the space market. Hanwha jointly established "Space Research Center" with KAIST, is developing urban air mobility with American company Over Air, testing an electric propulsion system that would be used in air taxis, and took a 8.8% stake in British company OneWeb, a satellite communication service provider as of 2022.
 Chemicals & Materials
 Construction
 Financial Services
 Leisure & Lifestyle

Affiliates 

Hanwha Corporation

Hanwha Aerospace  

Hanwha Techwin

Hanwha Systems

Hanwha Defense

Hanwha Power Systems

Hanwha Precision Machinery

Hanwha Solutions

Hanwha Impact

Hanwha TotalEnergies Petrochemical

Yeochun NCC

Hanwha Engineering & Construction

Hanwha Q Cells

Hanwha Energy

Hanwha City Development

Hanwha Life

Hanwha Asset Management

Hanwha General Insurance

Hanwha Savings Bank

Hanwha Hotels & Resorts

Hanwha Galleria

Hanwha Galleria Timeworld

Hanwha 63 City

Hanwha Station Development

Hanwha Eagles

Hanwha Hotels & Resorts

Awards 

 Old Tower Industrial Medal, November 1982
 $100 Million Export Tower Award, November 1982
 Silver Tower Industrial Medal and the $1 Billion Export Tower Award, November 1998
 Gold Tower Industrial Medal (45th Annual Trade Day Ceremony), December 2008
 $2 Billion Export Tower Award (45th Annual Trade Day Ceremony), December 2008

Sports teams 
 Hanwha Eagles
 Hanwha Life Esports

See also 
 List of Korean companies
 Economy of South Korea
 Aqua Planet (aquarium)
 Binggrae

Notes

References 

 
Chaebol
Conglomerate companies established in 1952
Construction and civil engineering companies of South Korea
Electrical engineering companies
Engineering companies of South Korea
Defence companies of South Korea
Explosives manufacturers
Holding companies of South Korea
Multinational companies headquartered in South Korea
Energy companies of South Korea
Companies based in Seoul
Companies listed on the Korea Exchange
South Korean brands
Construction and civil engineering companies established in 1952
1952 establishments in South Korea
South Korean companies established in 1952
Manufacturing companies established in 1952